In computability theory, computational complexity theory and proof theory, the slow-growing hierarchy is an ordinal-indexed family of slowly increasing functions gα: N → N (where N is the set of natural numbers, {0, 1, ...}). It contrasts with the fast-growing hierarchy.

Definition 
Let μ be a large countable ordinal such that a fundamental sequence is assigned to every limit ordinal less than μ.  The slow-growing hierarchy of functions gα: N → N, for α < μ, is then defined as follows:

 for limit ordinal α.

Here α[n] denotes the nth element of the fundamental sequence assigned to the limit ordinal α.

The article on the Fast-growing hierarchy describes a standardized choice for fundamental sequence for all α < ε0.

Relation to fast-growing hierarchy 
The slow-growing hierarchy grows much more slowly than the fast-growing hierarchy. Even gε0 is only equivalent to f3 and gα only attains the growth of fε0 (the first function that Peano arithmetic cannot prove total in the hierarchy) when α is the Bachmann–Howard ordinal.

However, Girard proved that the slow-growing hierarchy eventually catches up with the fast-growing one. Specifically, that there exists an ordinal α such that for all integers n
gα(n) < fα(n) < gα(n + 1)
where fα are the functions in the fast-growing hierarchy. He further showed that the first α this holds for is the ordinal of the theory ID<ω of arbitrary finite iterations of an inductive definition. However, for the assignment of fundamental sequences found in  the first match up occurs at the level ε0.

Extensions of the result proved to considerably larger ordinals show that there are very few ordinals below the ordinal of transfinitely iterated -comprehension where the slow- and fast-growing hierarchy match up.

The slow-growing hierarchy depends extremely sensitively on the choice of the underlying fundamental sequences.

Relation to term rewriting 
Cichon provided an interesting connection between the slow-growing hierarchy and derivation length for term rewriting.

References 

 PDF's: part 1 2 3. (In particular part 3, Section 12, pp. 59–64, "A Glimpse at Hierarchies of Fast and Slow Growing Functions".)

Notes 

Computability theory
Proof theory
Hierarchy of functions